Charles Francis Potter (October 28, 1885 – October 4, 1962) was an American Unitarian minister, theologian, and author.

In 1923 and 1924, he became nationally known through a series of debates with John Roach Straton, a fundamentalist Christian. They were soon published in four volumes entitled The Battle Over the Bible, Evolution versus Creation, The Virgin Birth—Fact or Fiction? and Was Christ Both Man and God?

Scopes Trial
In 1925 he was adviser on the Bible to Clarence Darrow in his defense of John Thomas Scopes, a schoolteacher who was charged with teaching evolution in his classes.

Education
He was born in Marlborough, Massachusetts, where his father was a shoe-factory worker, and received his education at Bucknell University, Brown University and Newton Theological Institution.

Beginning his career as a Baptist minister, his developing liberal theological views led him to resign his ministry and convert to Unitarianism serving in a number of congregations before being called to the West Side Unitarian Church in New York City in 1920. However, he resigned his position in 1925 because, he explained, even a liberal pulpit did not afford all the necessary freedom of expression. The next year he took a position of professor of comparative religion at Antioch College.

Humanism 
In 1927 Potter returned to the ministry at the Church of the Divine Paternity, a Universalist congregation on Manhattan's Upper West Side. In 1929, his progressive ideas led him to resign his post and found the First Humanist Society of New York, whose advisory board included Julian Huxley, John Dewey, Albert Einstein, and Thomas Mann. Together with Dewey, Potter was one of the original 34 signers of the first Humanist Manifesto in 1933. 

"Humanism is not the abolition of religion," Potter was quoted as saying, "but the beginning of real religion. By freeing religion of supernaturalism, it will release tremendous reserves of hitherto thwarted power. Man has waited too long for God to do what man ought to do himself and is fully capable of doing." It was to be, he said, "a religion of common sense; and the chief end of man is to improve himself, both as an individual and as a race."

Social justice
Potter became a vocal advocate for social reform, campaigning vigorously against capital punishment, promoting "civil divorce laws," and supporting birth control and women's rights. 
He was also the founder, in 1938, of the Euthanasia Society of America, helping to raise the issue of euthanasia before the American public.

Published works

See also
Religious Humanism

References

External links
 Dictionary of Unitarian & Universalist Biography
 

1885 births
1962 deaths
American Unitarians
American humanists